Adaa Khan (born 12 May 1989) is an Indian television actress and model . She is known for portraying Akashi in Behenein, Amrit in Amrit Manthan, Shesha in Naagin and Sitara in Vish Ya Amrit: Sitara. In 2020, she participated in Fear Factor: Khatron Ke Khiladi 10.

Early life

Khan was born in Mumbai, Maharashtra on 12 May 1989. Her mother Parvin Khan died from cancer in March 2013. She has a brother named Imran Khan.

Career
Khan began her career as a model. Then she did several advertisements.

Post modelling and advertisements, Khan decided to start her acting career in television. In 2009, she debuted into Hindi television industry playing the role of Vigya in Sony Entertainment Television's show Palampur Express.

In 2010, she bagged Star Plus's show Behenein. It centers around the story of four rich and beautiful sisters. She was cast as the parallel lead Aakashi Shastri.

In 2012, Khan got her first leading role in Director's Kut Productions drama Amrit Manthan as the heroic Princess Amrit Kaur Sodhi, co-starring Ankita Sharma, Dimple Jhangiani and Wasim Mushtaq.

She did episodic roles in shows like Yeh Hai Aashiqui, Crime Patrol, Code Red and Savdhaan India @ 11. She was also a contestant on the reality show Welcome – Baazi Mehmaan Nawazi Ki.

In 2015, Khan got the role of Shesha, a shape-shifting serpent in Naagin. Her fierce looks and dialogue delivery made her character very popular among the audiences. In 2016, she reprised her role of Shesha in Naagin 2. In 2018, she played the lead role of Sitara in the supernatural series Vish Ya Amrit: Sitara.

In 2019, she appeared as a guest in the last few episodes of Naagin 3, reprising her role of Shesha.

In 2020, she participated in Fear Factor: Khatron Ke Khiladi 10.
The same year, she appeared as Shesha again in a guest role in Naagin 5. In 2022, she was seen as Shesha in Naagin: Basant Panchami Special. In 2023, She appeared as Shesha again in Naagin 6 in a pivotal role.

Filmography

Television

Special appearances

Web series

Music videos

Awards and nominations

See also
List of Hindi television actresses
List of Indian television actresses

References

External links

 
 

Living people
Indian television actresses
Indian soap opera actresses
Participants in Indian reality television series
Fear Factor: Khatron Ke Khiladi participants
Place of birth missing (living people)
1989 births
Actresses from Mumbai